Ford Tickford Racing may refer to:

Glenn Seton Racing - former Australian racing team
Tickford Racing - current Australian racing team